The 1982 NCAA Women's Gymnastics championship involved 10 schools competing for the national championship of women's NCAA Division I gymnastics.  It was the first NCAA gymnastics national championship but not the first championship for college gymnastics.  The NCAA took over for the AIAW in 1982 in determining national champions.  The defending AIAW Champion for 1981 was Utah.  The Competition took place in Salt Lake City, Utah hosted by the University of Utah in the Jon M. Huntsman Center.

Team Results

Top Ten Individual All-Around Results

Individual Event Finals Results

Vault

Uneven Bars

Balance Beam

Floor Exercise

References

External links
  Gym Results

NCAA Women's Gymnastics championship
NCAA Women's Gymnastics Championship